The Last Summer is a 1954 West German drama film directed by Harald Braun and starring Hardy Krüger, Liselotte Pulver and Mathias Wieman. It was shot at the Bavaria Studios in Munich. The film's sets were designed by the art directors Kurt Herlth and Robert Herlth.

Cast
 Hardy Krüger as Rikola Valbo
 Liselotte Pulver as Jessika Tolemainen, Tochter
 Mathias Wieman as President Carlo Tolemainen
 Brigitte Horney as Tatjana Tolemainen
 René Deltgen as Gawan Massi
 Nadja Tiller as Anja, seine Schwester
 Werner Hinz as Der Innenminister
 Paul Bildt as Vittunen, Klavierstimmer
 Leonard Steckel as Kommissar Berki
 Käthe Haack as Frau Lundgreen
 Uta Hallant as KatjaTolemainen, Tochter
 Rolf Henniger as Olaf Lundgreen, Ministerialrat
 Peter Arens as Der Major
 Claus Biederstaedt as Der Leutnant
 Heidi Brühl as Jessikas Schwester
 Kurt Horwitz as Der Bischof
 Nicolas Koline as Stepan, der Diener
 Alfred Menhardt as Der Lagerverwalter

See also
The Guardian Angel (1990)

References

Bibliography

External links 
 

1954 films
West German films
German drama films
1954 drama films
1950s German-language films
Films directed by Harald Braun
Films based on short fiction
Films set in Europe
Films about assassinations
Bavaria Film films
German black-and-white films
1950s German films
Films shot at Bavaria Studios